Adil Aouchiche (born 15 July 2002) is a French professional footballer who plays as an attacking midfielder for  club Lorient.

Club career

Paris Saint-Germain 
An academy graduate of Paris Saint-Germain, Aouchiche made his professional debut on 30 August 2019 in a 2–0 league win against Metz. He started the match and played 65 minutes before getting replaced by Leandro Paredes. He scored his first goal on 5 January 2020 in a 6–0 Coupe de France win against Linas-Montlhéry. This made him the second youngest player ever to score a goal for PSG in official competitions, only behind Bartholomew Ogbeche. He made his third and final appearance for the club as a substitute in a 6–1 cup win against Dijon.

On 29 May 2020, Aouchiche underwent an introductory medical with Saint-Étienne ahead of a potential free transfer to the club. On 15 June 2020, he was nominated for the 2020 Golden Boy Award, being one of three PSG players in the 100-player shortlist.

Saint-Étienne 
On 20 July 2020, Aouchiche signed for Ligue 1 club Saint-Étienne. He made his debut for the club in a 2–0 league win against Lorient on 30 August, and scored his first goal on 20 September in a 2–2 draw against Nantes.

Lorient 
On 1 September 2022, Aouchiche joined Ligue 1 club Lorient on a four-year contract.

International career 
Born in France, Aouchiche is of Algerian descent, being born to both an Algerian mother and father. He is eligible to play for either France, his nation of birth, or Algeria, the nation of his parents heritage to. He is a current French youth international. He became the focus of attention in 2019 UEFA European Under-17 Championship due to his goalscoring prowess. Despite being a midfielder, he scored 9 goals from 5 matches in the tournament as France reached semi-finals. He scored a hat-trick against Sweden in a group stage match and netted another four goals in quarter-final clash against Czech Republic. He is yet to choose a permanent Nation to represent.

He went on to break several records during the tournament including that of scoring most goals in a single U17 Euro campaign, which was previously held by his compatriots Odsonne Édouard and Amine Gouiri for scoring 8 goals in 2015 and 2017 respectively. He also became the all-time top scorer in the history of UEFA European Under-17 Championship, a feat which was previously shared by Édouard, Gouiri and Abel Ruiz. His tally of 9 goals also equalled the record for most goals in any UEFA football national-team finals tournament, which he currently shares with Michel Platini, Elena Danilova and Shekiera Martinez. His stellar performances earned him a spot in the team of the tournament.

Style of play 
Aouchiche is an attacking midfielder, gifted with above-average technical skills. He excels in chance creation and dribbling.

Career statistics

Honours 
Paris Saint-Germain
Ligue 1: 2019–20
Coupe de France: 2019–20
France U17
 FIFA U-17 World Cup third place: 2019
Individual
FIFA U-17 World Cup Silver Ball: 2019
UEFA European Under-17 Championship Top goalscorer: 2019
UEFA European Under-17 Championship Team of the Tournament: 2019
Maurice Revello Tournament Best XI: 2022

References

External links 

 Profile at the Paris Saint-Germain F.C. website
 
 
 

 
 

2002 births
Living people
People from Le Blanc-Mesnil
Footballers from Seine-Saint-Denis
French footballers
French sportspeople of Algerian descent
France youth international footballers
Association football midfielders
Paris Saint-Germain F.C. players
AS Saint-Étienne players
FC Lorient players
Ligue 1 players
Ligue 2 players
Championnat National 2 players